Colorado is a 1921 American silent Western film directed by B. Reeves Eason and starring Frank Mayo, Charles Newton and Gloria Hope.

Cast
 Frank Mayo as Frank Austin
 Charles Newton as Tom Doyle
 Gloria Hope as Kitty Doyle
 Lillian West as Mrs Doyle
 Charles Le Moyne as James Kincaid
 Tom London as David Collins 
 Dan Crimmins as Lem Morgan
 Rosa Gore as Salla Morgan

References

Bibliography
 Connelly, Robert B. The Silents: Silent Feature Films, 1910-36, Volume 40, Issue 2. December Press, 1998.
 Munden, Kenneth White. The American Film Institute Catalog of Motion Pictures Produced in the United States, Part 1. University of California Press, 1997.

External links
 

1921 films
1921 Western (genre) films
Silent American Western (genre) films
American silent feature films
American black-and-white films
1920s English-language films
Films directed by B. Reeves Eason
Universal Pictures films
1920s American films